Quizás may refer to:

Quizás (album), a 2002 album by Enrique Iglesias

Songs

"Quizás, Quizás, Quizás", written by Osvaldo Farrés and covered by Nat King Cole, Chaquito, Ibrahim Ferrer, Jeff Harnar, Anaïs Croze, and Florent Pagny
"Quizás" (Enrique Iglesias song), title track of the 2002 album
"Quizás", single by Mari Trini, composed M. Trini 1972
"Quizás", song by Milly Quezada, composed Gustavo Marquez, from 22 Ultimate Merengue Hits 2002 and Serie Azul Tropical 2003
"Quizás", song by N'Klabe, composed Hector Torres from I Love Salsa! 2005
"Quizás", song by Naela (:es:Quizás (canción de Naela))
"Quizás", song by Toby Love and Yuridia (:es:Quizás (canción de Toby Love))
"Quizás", song by Tony Dize on the album Los Vaqueros